The Camano class was a class of light cargo ships of the United States Navy. The fifteen  ships of the class were originally built as Design 381 coastal freighters or Design 427 coastal freighters and were converted to light cargo ships during 1949 and 1950 after acquisition by the United States Navy.

Ships in class

References

Auxiliary ship classes of the United States Navy
Cargo ships of the United States Navy
Camano-class cargo ships
Auxiliary transport ship classes